Coscinesthes porosa is a species of beetle in the family Cerambycidae. It was described by Henry Walter Bates in 1890.

References

Lamiini
Beetles described in 1890